Borzya-2 (also referred to as Borzia, Borzyu, and Borzya Northwest) is an air base in Zabaykalsky Krai, Russia located 13 km west of Borzya. It is a simple fighter base with three areas of fighter revetments housing about 30 aircraft. The dispersal field for this airbase was Arabatuk, located 30 km away from Borzya.

Units stationed at Borzya include:
 189 Gv APIB (189th Guards Fighter-Bomber Aviation Regiment) flying Sukhoi Su-17M3 aircraft around 1988.  This regiment was subordinate to 23 OA (23rd Air Army, i.e. Trans-Baikal Air Army).
 101 ORAP (101st Independent Reconnaissance Aviation Regiment) flying Sukhoi Su-17M3R aircraft.

References

External links
RussianAirFields.com

Soviet Air Force bases
Soviet Frontal Aviation
Russian Air Force bases